Výčapy is a municipality and village in Třebíč District in the Vysočina Region of the Czech Republic. It has about 900 inhabitants.

Administrative parts
The village of Štěpánovice is an administrative part of Výčapy.

References

Villages in Třebíč District